Mansueto Merati, B. (1590–1662) was a Roman Catholic prelate who served as Bishop of Acerra (1644–1662).

Biography
Mansueto Merati was born in Milan, Italy in 1590 and ordained a priest in the Clerics Regular of St. Paul.
On 13 July 1644, he was appointed during the papacy of Pope Urban VIII as Bishop of Acerra.
He served as Bishop of Acerra until his death in 1662.

References

External links and additional sources
 (for Chronology of Bishops) 
 (for Chronology of Bishops) 

17th-century Italian Roman Catholic bishops
Bishops appointed by Pope Urban VIII
Clergy from Milan
1590 births
1662 deaths
Barnabite bishops